Krrabë is a town and a former municipality in the Tirana County, central Albania. At the 2015 local government reform it became a subdivision of the municipality Tirana. The population at the 2011 census was 2,343.

History 
The village has been inhabited since ancient times by Illyrians who built the Persqopi Castle near Krrabë.

References

Former municipalities in Tirana County
Administrative units of Tirana
Towns in Albania